Polden Chhopang Gurung is a Nepali politician, and a member of the House of Representatives of the Federal Parliament of Nepal. He was elected from Manang constituency as a candidate for the Communist Party of Nepal (Unified Marxist-Leninist) (CPN UML), defeating his closest rival, Tek Bahadur Gurung of Nepali Congress, by 2,300 votes to 2,021. He is an apple farmer by profession. CPN UML's district chairperson for Manang, Gurung became the party's candidate after Dipak Manange, whom the party was supporting, withdrew his candidacy. Gurung won in the constituency with a previously very weak presence of CPN UML; the party's candidate had received 70 votes in the previous election.

References

People from Manang District, Nepal
Communist Party of Nepal (Unified Marxist–Leninist) politicians
21st-century Nepalese politicians
Place of birth missing (living people)
Living people
Nepal MPs 2017–2022
Nepal Communist Party (NCP) politicians
Gurung people
1959 births